is a Japanese actress, voice actress and singer affiliated with Axlone. She is known for voicing Makoto Kenzaki/Cure Sword from DokiDoki! PreCure and as the singer of several Pretty Cure songs.

Biography
Kanako Miyamoto was born on November 4, 1989 in Ibaraki Prefecture.

She was a member of the Cure Rainbows who performed Arigatō ga Ippai, the ending song of Pretty Cure All Stars DX3: Deliver the Future! The Rainbow-Colored Flower That Connects the World. In 2013, she voiced Cure Sword (Makoto Kenzaki) in DokiDoki! PreCure. She reprised her role as Cure Sword in the Hugtto! PreCure Futari wa Pretty Cure: All Stars Memories crossover film.

She also performed both ending songs of Kirakira PreCure a la Mode and she and Yuri Komagata, who also sang that show's opening theme song, both make cameo appearances as a pair of people auditioning for an in-universe television show alongside Himari Arisugawa/Cure Custard in the 43rd episode, which aired on 10 December 2017. She also performed the opening song of Hug! Pretty Cure.

Personal life
She announced her marriage to a non-celebrity husband on February 11, 2019, and on July 16, 2020, she announced the birth of her first child.

Filmography

Anime
2007
Yes! PreCure 5, Kanako Miyamoto
2009
Cookin Idol Ai! My! My! Main!, Reira Himenokōji
Anyamaru Tantei Kiruminzuu, Kasumi Miyabe
2011
Last Exile: Fam, The Silver Wing, Runa
Tamayura: Hitotose, Kou Sawatari
2012
Blast of Tempest, Miki
Eureka Seven: AO, Arata Naru
Tanken Driland, Mikoto
2013
Aikatsu!, Noel Otoshiro
CR Genroku Gijin Tenroman, Orin, Ikushima
DokiDoki! PreCure, Makoto Kenzaki/Cure Sword
Lupin III: Princess of the Breeze - Hidden City in the Sky, Rasha
Mangirl!, Hana Sasayama
Tamayura: More Aggressive, Kou Sawatari
Tanken Driland: Sennen no Mahō, Jackie, Mikoto
Red Data Girl, Ayumi Watanabe
2014
HappinessCharge PreCure!, Makoto Kenzaki/Cure Sword
Robot Girls Z, Glossom X2
2017
Kirakira Pretty Cure a la Mode, Kanako

Film
2007
Yes! PreCure 5 the Movie: Great Miraculous Adventure in the Mirror Kingdom!, Pinky
2012
Fuse Teppō Musume no Torimonochō, Meido
2013
Pretty Cure All Stars New Stage 2: Friends of the Heart, Makoto Kenzaki/Cure Sword
DokiDoki! Precure the Movie: Mana's Getting Married!!? The Dress of Hope that Connects to the Future, Makoto Kenzaki/Cure Sword
2014
Pretty Cure All Stars New Stage 3: Eternal Friends, Makoto Kenzaki/Cure Sword
2015
Pretty Cure All Stars: Spring Carnival♪, Makoto Kenzaki/Cure Sword
Tamayura: Sotsugyō Shashin, Kou Sawatari
2016
Pretty Cure All Stars: Singing with Everyone♪ Miraculous Magic!, Makoto Kenzaki/Cure Sword
2018
Hug! Pretty Cure Futari wa Pretty Cure: All Stars Memories, Makoto Kenzaki/Cure Sword

Video games
2010
God Eater, Player's Voice
2016
Grimms Notes, Marie Antoinette

Discography

Albums

Albums

References

1989 births
Living people
Anime singers
Japanese musical theatre actresses
Japanese stage actresses
Japanese video game actresses
Japanese voice actresses
Voice actresses from Ibaraki Prefecture
21st-century Japanese singers
21st-century Japanese women singers